Canary Islanders, or Canarians, are a Romance people and ethnic group. They reside on the Canary Islands, an autonomous community of Spain near the coast of northwest Africa, and descend from a mixture of European settlers and aboriginal Guanche peoples. Genetics shows modern Canarian people to be, on average, a population of mostly European ancestry, with some Northwest African admixture. The distinctive variety of the Spanish language spoken in the region is known as habla canaria (Canary speech) or the (dialecto) canario (Canarian dialect). The Canarians, and their descendants, played a major role during the conquest, colonization, and eventual independence movements of various countries in Latin America. Their ethnic and cultural presence is most palpable in the countries of Uruguay, Venezuela, Cuba and the Dominican Republic as well as the U.S. territory of Puerto Rico.

History

The original inhabitants of the Canary Islands are commonly known as Guanches (although this term in its strict sense only refers to the original inhabitants of Tenerife). They are believed to be related to the Berber peoples of northern Africa.

The islands were conquered by Castile at the beginning of the 15th century. In 1402, they began to subdue and suppress the native Guanche population. The Guanches were initially enslaved  and gradually absorbed. As a result, genetic analyses of modern Canarians show mainly a mixture of European and North African genes, and low frequencies of sub-Saharan genes, with quite a lot of variation (see Ancestry).

After subsequent settlement by Europeans, the remaining Guanches were gradually assimilated by the settlers and their culture largely vanished. Alonso Fernández de Lugo, conqueror of Tenerife and La Palma, oversaw extensive immigration to these islands during a short period from the late 1490s to the 1520s from mainland Europe, mostly Castile and Portugal. At subsequent judicial enquiries, Fernández de Lugo was accused of favoring Genoese and Portuguese immigrants over Castilians.

Ancestry

The native inhabitants of the Canary Islands hold a gene pool that is predominantly European and native Guanche. Guanche genetic markers have also been found recently in Puerto Rico and, at low frequencies, in peninsular Spain after later emigration from the Canary Islands.

Population genetics

Uniparental markers
The most frequent (maternal-descent) mtDNA haplogroup in Canary Islands is H (37.6%), followed by U6 (14.0%), T (12.7%), not-U6 U (10.3%) and J (7.0%). Two haplogroups, H and U6, alone account for more than 50% of the individuals. Significant frequencies of sub-Saharan maternal L haplogroups (6.6%) is also consistent with the historical records on introduction of sub-Saharan female slave labour in Canary Islands. However, some Sub-Saharan female lineages are also found in North African populations, and as a result, some of these L lineages could have been introduced to the Islands from North Africa. A 2009 study of DNA extracted from the remains of aboriginal inhabitants found that 7% of lineages were haplogroup L, which leaves open the possibility that these L lineages were part of the founding population of the Canary Islands. Sub-Saharan female lineages have been found in frequencies of 10% or more in some islands.

A 2003 genetics research article by Nicole Maca-Meyer et al. published in the European Journal of Human Genetics compared aboriginal Guanche mtDNA (collected from Canarian archaeological sites) to that of today's Canarians and concluded that "despite the continuous changes suffered by the population (Spanish colonization, slave trade), aboriginal mtDNA lineages constitute a considerable proportion [42–73%] of the Canarian gene pool". According to this article, both percentages are obtained using two different estimation methods; nevertheless according to the same  study the percentage that could be more reliable is the one of 73%.

Although the Berbers are the most probable ancestors of the Guanches, it is deduced that important human movements (e.g., the Islamic-Arabic conquest of the Berbers) have reshaped Northwest Africa after the migratory wave to the Canary Islands and the "results support, from a maternal perspective, the supposition that since the end of the 16th century, at least, two-thirds of the Canarian population had an indigenous substrate, as was previously inferred from historical and anthropological data." mtDNA haplogroup U subclade U6b1 is Canarian-specific

A 2019 genetics research article confirms that most lineages observed in the ancient samples have a Mediterranean distribution, and belong to lineages associated with the Neolithic expansion in the Near East and Europe (T,J,X…). This phylogeographic analysis of Canarian ancient mitogenomes, the first of its kind, shows that some lineages are restricted to Central North Africa (H1cf, J2a2d and T2c1d3), while others have a wider distribution, including both West and Central North Africa, and, Europe and the Near East.

Y-DNA, or Y-chromosomal, (direct paternal) lineages were not analysed in this study; however, an earlier study giving the aboriginal y-DNA contribution at 6% was cited by Maca-Meyer et al., but the results were criticized as possibly flawed due to the widespread phylogeography of y-DNA haplogroup E1b1b1b, which may skew determination of the aboriginality versus coloniality of contemporary y-DNA lineages in the Canaries. Regardless, Maca-Meyer et al. state that historical evidence does support the explanation of "strong sexual asymmetry...as a result of a strong bias favoring matings between European males and aboriginal females, and to the important aboriginal male mortality during the Conquest."

Indeed, according to a recent study by Fregel et al. 2009, in spite of the geographic nearness between the Canary Islands and Morocco the genetic ancestry of the Canary islands males is mainly of European origin. Nearly 67% of the haplogroups resulting from are Euro–Eurasian (R1a (2.76%), R1b (50.62%), J (14%), I (9.66%) and G (3.99%)). Unsurprisingly the Castillian conquest brought the genetic base of the current male population of the Canary Islands. Nevertheless, the second most important haplogroup origin is Northern Africa. E1b1b (14% including 8.30% of the typical berber haplogroup E-M81), E1b1a and E1a (1.50%), and T (3%) haplogroups are present at a rate of 33%. According to the same study, the presence of autochthonous North African E-M81 lineages, and also other relatively abundant markers (E-M78 and J-M267) from the same region in the indigenous Guanche population, "strongly points to that area [North Africa] as the most probable origin of the Guanche ancestors". In this study, Fregel et al.  estimated that, based on Y-chromosome and mtDNA haplogroup frequencies, the relative female and male indigenous Guanche contributions to the present-day Canary Islands populations were respectively of 41.8% and 16.1%.

Mitochondrial DNA                  
 
Regarding mitochondrial DNA, the maternal lineages of Canary Islanders are characterized by the prevalence of European ancestry in all islands except La Gomera, in which the Northwest African lineage is stronger.
   

A 2002 study analyzing the mithocondrial DNA from the teeth of the 18th century Canarian population, found that the 18th century Canary Islanders had a bit more of North African heritage than European, with minor Sub-Saharian roots, which the author links to the former trade of black slaves.

Autosomal DNA
An autosomal study in 2011 found an average Northwest African influence of about 17% in Canary Islanders with a wide interindividual variation ranging from 0% to 96%. According to the authors, the substantial Northwest African ancestry found for Canary Islanders supports that, despite the aggressive conquest by Castile in the 15th century and the subsequent immigration, genetic footprints of the first settlers of the Canary Islands persist in the current inhabitants. Paralleling mtDNA findings, the largest average Northwest African contribution was found for the samples from La Gomera.

Another recent study by Guillen-Guio et al. 2018 sequenced the entire genomes of a sample of 400 adult men and women from all the islands except La Graciosa to determine the relationship of Canarian genetic diversity to the more frequent complex pathologies in the archipielago. The study indicated that Canarian DNA shows distinctive genetic markers, the result of a combination of factors such as the geographic isolation of the islands, the adaption to the environment of its inhabitants and the historic admixture of the Pre-Hispanic population of the archipielago (coming from North Africa), with European and from Sub-Saharan area individuals. Drawing on these data, it was estimated that the Canarian population is, on average at an autosomal level, 75% European, 22% North African and 3% Sub-saharan. According to the authors "the proportion of SSA ancestry we observed in Canary Islanders likely originated in the postconquest importation of enslaved African people.". This study reported the below Genomic Ancestry Proportions in Canary Islanders.

Source: Genomic Ancestry Proportions (from ADMIXTURE, K-4) in Canary Islanders (Guillen-Guio et al. 2018)

Ancient Canarians

The Guanches are related to the indigenous Berbers. In 2017, the first genome-wide data from the Guanches confirmed a North African origin and that they were genetically most similar to ancient North African Berber peoples of the nearby North African mainland. It also showed that modern inhabitants of Gran Canaria carry an estimated 16%–31% Guanche autosomal ancestry.

Culture

Modern-day Canarian culture is Spanish, with some Guanche influences. Some of the Canarian traditional sports such as lucha canaria ("Canarian fight"), juego del palo ("stick game") or salto del pastor ("shepherd's jump"), among others, have their roots in Guanche culture. Additionally, other traditions include Canarian pottery, words of Guanche origin in the Canarian speech and the rural consumption of guarapo gomero and gofio. This indigenous whistled language was invented by the Guanches, and was then adopted by the Spanish settlers in the 16th century after the Guanches were culturally assimilated into the population. The language was also formerly spoken on El Hierro, Tenerife and Gran Canaria

The holidays celebrated in the Canary Islands are of international, national and regional or insular character. The official day of the autonomous community is Canary Islands Day on 30 May. The anniversary of the first session of the Parliament of the Canary Islands, based in the city of Santa Cruz de Tenerife, held on 30 May 1983, is commemorated with this day. The most famous festival of the Canary Islands is the carnival. The carnival is celebrated in all the islands and all its municipalities, perhaps the two busiest being those of the two Canarian capitals; the Carnival of Santa Cruz de Tenerife (Tourist Festival of International Interest) and the Carnival of Las Palmas de Gran Canaria. It is celebrated on the streets between the months of February and March. But the rest of the islands of the archipelago have their carnivals with their own traditions among which stand out: The Festival of the Carneros of El Hierro, the Festival of the Diabletes of Teguise in Lanzarote, Los Indianos de La Palma, the Carnival of San Sebastián de La Gomera and the Carnival of Puerto del Rosario in Fuerteventura.

The strong influence of Latin America in Canarian culture is due to the constant emigration and return over the centuries of Canarians to that continent, chiefly to Puerto Rico, Cuba, the Dominican Republic, and Venezuela. To a lesser extent, they also went to the US states of Louisiana (mostly the southern portion) and Texas (mostly in and around San Antonio), and some areas in eastern Mexico including Nuevo León and Veracruz.

Religion

Catholic Church 

The majority of native Canary Islanders are Roman Catholic with various smaller foreign-born populations of other Christian beliefs such as Protestants from northern Europe.

The appearance of the Virgin of Candelaria (Patron of Canary Islands) was credited with moving the Canary Islands toward Christianity. Two Catholic saints were born in the Canary Islands: Peter of Saint Joseph de Betancur and José de Anchieta. Both born on the island of Tenerife, they were respectively missionaries in Guatemala and Brazil.

The Canary Islands are divided into two Catholic dioceses, each governed by a bishop:
 Diócesis Canariense: Includes the islands of the Eastern Province: Gran Canaria, Fuerteventura and Lanzarote. Its capital was San Marcial El Rubicón (1404) and Las Palmas de Gran Canaria (1483–present). There was a previous bishopric which was based in Telde, but it was later abolished.
 Diócesis Nivariense: Includes the islands of the western province: Tenerife, La Palma, La Gomera and El Hierro. Its capital is San Cristóbal de La Laguna (1819–present).

Other religions
Around 5 percent of Canarians belong to a minority religion. Separate from the overwhelming Christian majority are a minority of Muslims who are usually foreign-born. At present, there are in the Canary Islands a figure of approximately 70,000 Muslims and 40 mosques and places of worship throughout the archipelago.

Among the followers of Islam, the Islamic Federation of the Canary Islands exists to represent the Islamic community in the Canary Islands as well as to provide practical support to members of the Islamic community.

Statistics 
The distribution of beliefs in 2012 according to the CIS Barometer Autonomy was as follows:
Catholic 84.9%
Atheist/Agnostic/Unbeliever 12.3%
Other religions 1.7%
Among the believers 38.7% go to religious services frequently.

Canarian diaspora

Historically, the Canary Islands have served as a hub between Spain and the Americas; favoured by that circumstance, large groups of Canary islanders have emigrated and settled all over the New World as early as the 15th century, mainly in Cuba, Puerto Rico, Dominican Republic, Colombia, Venezuela and Uruguay.

Demographics
The Canarian population includes long-tenured and new waves of mainland Spanish immigrants, including Andalucians, Galicians, Castilians, Catalans, Basques and Asturians of Spain; old settlers of Portuguese, Italian, the Dutch or Flemish, British, and French origin, as well as recent foreign-born arrivals. In 2019 the total population was 2,153,389, of which 72.1% were native Canary Islanders. A total of 80.6%, or 1,735,457, were born in Spain and 19.4%, or 417,932, were born outside the country. Of these, the majority are from the Americas, mainly from Venezuela (66,573) and Cuba (41,792) and Colombia (31,368). There are 38,768 people from Africa, the majority from Morocco (24,268).

Canarian identity
According to a 2012 study by the Centro de Investigaciones Sociológicas, when asked about national identity, the majority of respondents from the Canary Islands (49.3%) consider themselves Spanish and Canarian in equal measures, followed by 37.1% who consider themselves more Canarian than Spanish. Only 6.1% of the respondents consider themselves only Canarian.

Notable Canarians

 Wenceslao Benítez Inglott, navy officer, scientist, and engineer.
Javier Bardem, actor
 José de Anchieta, Jesuit priest, saint and missionary in Brazil.
 Rosana Arbelo, singer
 Mary of Jesus de León y Delgado, Dominican lay Sister and mystic.
 Amaro Pargo, one of the most famous corsairs of the golden age of piracy.
 Rafael Arozarena, writer
 Carolina Bang, actress
 Bencomo, pre-Hispanic King
 Beneharo, pre-Hispanic King
 Agustín de Betancourt y Molina, engineer, Russian General
 Peter of Saint Joseph Betancur, saint and missionary in Guatemala.
 Manolo Blahnik, fashion designer
 José Comas Quesada, painter
 Óscar Domínguez, painter
 Ana Guerra, singer
 Agoney, singer
 Doramas, pre-Hispanic warrior
 José Doreste, sailor, yacht racer and Olympic champion
 Luis Doreste, sailor, yacht racer and world champion and Olympic champion
 Ruslan Ela, soccer player
 Nicolás Estévanez, politician
 Juan Carlos Fresnadillo, filmmaker
 Pedro García Cabrera, poet
 Antonio González y González, scientist, chemist
 Fernando Guanarteme, pre-Hispanic king
 Pedro Guerra, music composer and singer
 Ángel Guimerá, writer
 Emeterio Gutiérrez Albelo, poet
 Nancy Fabiola Herrera, mezzo-soprano opera singer
 K-Narias, reggaeton pop duo
 Alfredo Kraus, opera singer
 Fernando León y Castillo, politician
 Juan Fernando López Aguilar, politician and jurist, former Minister of Justice
 Domingo López Torres, painter, writer, poet and Marxist revolutionary
 Maninidra, pre-Hispanic warrior
 César Manrique, artist
 Cristo Marrero Henríquez, professional footballer
 Manolo Millares, painter
 Francisco de Miranda, Venezuelan general, politician and precursor of South America independence
 Manuel Mora Morales, writer and filmmaker
 Juan Negrín, politician
 Leopoldo O'Donnell, General and statesman
 Frances Ondiviela, telenovela actress, former Miss Spain and model
 María Orán, soprano
 Benito Pérez Galdós, writer
 Domingo Pérez Minik, writer
 Narciso Rodriguez, American fashion designer born to Cuban parents with Canarian origins
 Sergio Rodríguez, NBA basketball player
 Pedro, professional footballer
 Aythami Ruano, judoka
 Jerónimo Saavedra, politician, mayor of Las Palmas and two times president of Canaries
 Victoria Sanchez, actress in American and Canadian movies and TV series
 David Silva, football player
 Carla Suárez Navarro, tennis player
 Tanausu, pre-Hispanic King of Aceró
 Tinguaro, pre-Hispanic warrior General
 Goya Toledo, actress and model
 Juan Carlos Valerón, football player
 Alberto Vázquez-Figueroa, writer
 José Vélez, singer
 Juan Verde Suárez, politician
 José Viera y Clavijo, historian
 Eduardo Westerdahl, painter, art critic and writer, member of the Surrealist movement

See also
 Berberism
 Canarian dialect
 Cubans
 Guanche language
 Isleños
 Nationalities in Spain
 White Puerto Ricans
 White Dominicans (Dominican Republic)

References

 
Ethnic groups in North Africa
Ethnic groups in Spain
History of North Africa
Romance peoples